The 1989 European Parliament election in Luxembourg was the election of the delegation from Luxembourg to the European Parliament in 1989.

Results

Footnotes

Luxembourg
European Parliament elections in Luxembourg
1989 in Luxembourg